Richmond Hill High School (RHHS) is a public high school in Richmond Hill, Georgia, United States, which teaches grades 9-12. RHHS is located in the center of Richmond Hill at 1 Wildcat Drive, which is named after the school's mascot.

Sports

Tennis 
In 2003, the Richmond Hill boys' tennis team, coached by Pat Paruso, played in the Final Four state tournament in Atlanta, where they lost versus The Westminster Schools. The 2002 Wildcat tennis team also went to the state tournament, but their run ended shortly in the first round.

Football 
Nick Fitzgerald (Class of 2014) was the starting quarterback for the Mississippi State Bulldogs of the Southeastern Conference from 2016-2018, compiling over 6,000 career passing yards and over 3,500 career rushing yards. Fitzgerald spent time on the rosters of the Tampa Bay Buccaneers (NFL), the St. Louis Battlehawks (XFL), and TSL Sea Lions (TSL) during his professional career.

On April 28, 2018, former RHHS and Middle Tennessee State University kicker Canon Rooker signed an undrafted free-agent deal with the New York Jets.

State titles
Boys' Basketball (3) - 1988(A), 1993(A), 1994(A)
Boys' Cross Country (1) - 2021(6A)
Duals Wrestling (1) - 2018(6A)
Traditional Wrestling (1) - 2018(6A)

Notable alumni

 Nick Fitzgerald

External links
 
 Bryan County Schools website

References

Public high schools in Georgia (U.S. state)
Schools in Bryan County, Georgia